Langa (Old Norse: Langey ) is the collective name for two uninhabited islands off Hildasay, in Shetland, Scotland. The islands are connected by a tombolo and are separated at high tide. It is not to be confused with the numerous islands called "Linga" in Shetland (- for which see Linga (disambiguation) or Lunga).

History
The name probably derives from langey, Old Norse for "long island".

The island was a separate croft during the 19th century. It had a recorded population of nine in 1841, and 13 in 1881, but was deserted in the 1890s.

References

Uninhabited islands of Shetland